Annette Beutler (born 29 June 1976) is a Swiss professional racing cyclist. She is part of the 2007 Team Flexpoint. She was the Swiss National Road Race champion in 2006.

Notable results
as of 2004
2006 (Buitenpoort–Flexpoint Team)
Holland Ladies Tour (1 stage)
L'Heure d'Or Féminine (2nd)
 National Road Race Championship (1st)
2005
 National Road Race Championship (3rd)
Tour du Grand Montréal (1 stage, 2nd overall)
Redlands Bicycle Classic (1 stage, 2nd overall)
2004
Giro d'Italia Femminile (1 stage)
Gracia–Orlová (1 stage, 2nd overall)

References

External links

1976 births
Living people
Swiss female cyclists
Place of birth missing (living people)